Chylice may refer to:

Chylice, Grodzisk Mazowiecki County, Poland
Chylice, Piaseczno County, Poland